Gérald Bastard (born 3 April 1950 in Paris) is a highly cited  French physicist known for his work on semiconductor heterostructures. , he is a research director at the Department of Physics of the École Normale Supérieure in Paris.

In 2000, Bastard and Emilio E. Mendez won the International Symposium on Compound Semiconductors
Quantum Device Award "for pioneering work on electric-field induced optic effects in quantum wells and superlattices (quantum-confined Stark effect and Wannier–Stark localization)".

Books

References

External links
Gerald Bastard. Homepage at Department of Physics, École Normale Supérieure

1950 births
French physicists
Academic staff of the École Normale Supérieure
Living people